Red Thread may refer to:

Mythology
 Red thread of fate, an East Asian mythological belief
 In Greek mythology, Theseus rescued himself out of the labyrinth of Minotaur by following a red thread, given to him by Ariadne

Arts and entertainment
 The Red Thread (Arab Strap album), 2001
 The Red Thread (Lucy Kaplansky album), 2004
 Red Thread Games, a Norwegian vigeo game developer
 Akai Ito (video game), literally Red Thread, a Japanese video game
 Akai Ito (TV series), a 2008–2009 Japanese television drama
 Akai Ito (film) a 2008 film released together with the television series

Other uses
 Red thread disease, a fungal infection common on grass lawns
 The Red Thread (De Rode Draad), the Dutch advocacy and support group for prostitutes

See also
Red string (disambiguation)